Mercy Bay is a Canadian Arctic waterway in the Northwest Territories. It is a southern arm of M'Clure Strait on northeast Banks Island. These bays are a part of Aulavik National Park.

HMS Investigator

In September 1851, Captain Robert McClure's ship,  became ice trapped in Mercy Bay during his search for the Northwest Passage and the lost Sir John Franklin Expedition.  By 1853, it was finally abandoned in the bay.  The crew sledged over ice to Melville Island, where they were rescued. 

In July 2010, Parks Canada archeologists looking for HMS Investigator found it fifteen minutes after they started a sonar scan of Banks Island, Mercy Bay, Northwest Territories.  The archaeology crew had no plans to raise the ship. They did a thorough sonar scan of the area, then sent an ROV (a remotely operated vehicle). The Canadian archaeologists found the ship "largely intact", sitting upright in approximately 25 feet of pristine Arctic water. Its masts were missing, probably sheared away by the ice.

References

External links 
 
 Video: Discovery of HMS Investigator

Bays of the Northwest Territories
Banks Island